The Church of Saint Thomas and the Annunciation is a historic church in Brno, Czech Republic.

The church was founded in the middle of 14th century by John Henry of Luxembourg, Margrave of Moravia, with active support of his brother Charles IV., Roman Emperor, originally as part of an Augustinian monastery. After six years of work the church was consecrated (March 13, 1356) by the Olomouc Bishop Jan Očko of Vlašim in the presence of King Charles IV, suzerain of John Henry. Margrave John Henry and his son Jobst of Moravia, titular King of the Germans, are buried here – in the tomb in front of the main altar.
John Henry's second consort, Margaret of Opava, reportedly is buried here, as well.

In the south nave is located famous example of polychromed stone statue in high Gothic style, known as  Pietà of Saint Thomas

Current baroque appearance dates back to the second half of the 17th century when the church was repaired and rebuilt after severe damage caused by the Swedish siege of Brno during the Thirty Years War.

The architect Adolf Loos was baptized in the church on 1 January 1871.

Further reading 
 Kühn, Karl F., 1943: Die Thomaskirche zu Brünn-Das werk der Parler Hütte. Brno: Rudolf M. Rohrer pp. 71 (in German)

References 

Churches in Brno
Roman Catholic churches in the Czech Republic
Burial sites of the House of Luxembourg